The Wizards or Istari in J. R. R. Tolkien's fiction were powerful angelic beings, Maiar, who took the form of Men to intervene in the affairs of Middle-earth in the Third Age, after catastrophically violent direct interventions by the Valar, and indeed by the one god Eru Ilúvatar, in the earlier ages.

Two Wizards, Gandalf the Grey and Saruman the White, largely represent the order, though a third Wizard, Radagast, appears briefly. Saruman is installed as the head of the White Council, but falls to the temptation of power. He imitates and is to an extent the double of the Dark Lord Sauron, only to become his unwitting servant. Gandalf ceaselessly assists the Company of the Ring in their quest to destroy the Ring and defeat Sauron. He forms the double of Saruman, as Saruman falls and is destroyed, while Gandalf rises and takes Saruman's place as the White Wizard. Gandalf resembles the Norse god Odin in his guise as Wanderer. He has been described as a figure of Christ.

All three named Wizards appear in Peter Jackson's The Lord of the Rings and The Hobbit film trilogies. Commentators have stated that they operate more physically and less spiritually than the Wizards in Tolkien's novels, but that this is mostly successful in furthering the drama.

Maiar 

The Wizards of Middle-earth are Maiar: spirits similar to the godlike Valar, but lesser in power. Outwardly resembling Men but possessing much greater physical and mental power, they are called Istari (Quenya for "Wise Ones") by the Elves. They were sent by the Valar to assist the free peoples of Middle-earth in the Third Age to counter the Dark Lord Sauron, a fallen Maia of great power.

Names

The first three of these five Wizards were named in The Lord of the Rings as Saruman "man of skill" (supposedly Rohirric, in reality from Old English), Gandalf "elf of the staff" (northern Men, in reality Old Norse), and Radagast "tender of beasts" (possibly Westron). Tolkien never provided non-Elvish names for the other two; their names in Valinor are stated as Alatar and Pallando, and in Middle-earth as Morinehtar and Rómestámo. Each Wizard in the series had robes of a characteristic  colour:  white for Saruman (the chief and the most powerful of the five), grey for Gandalf, brown for Radagast, and sea-blue for the other two, who are known as the Blue Wizards (Ithryn Luin in Sindarin). Gandalf and Saruman play important roles in The Lord of the Rings, while Radagast appears only briefly, more or less as a single plot device. He innocently helps Saruman to deceive Gandalf, who believes Radagast since he is honest, but fortuitously alerts the eagle Gwaihir to rescue Gandalf. The Blue Wizards do not feature in the narrative of Tolkien's works; they are said to have journeyed far into the east after their arrival in Middle-earth, and serve as agitators or missionaries in enemy occupied lands. Their ultimate fates are unknown.

Servants of the Valar 

As the Istari were Maiar, each one served a Vala in some way. Saruman was the servant and helper of Aulë, and so learned much in the art of craftsmanship, mechanics, and metal-working, as was seen in the later Third Age. Gandalf was the servant of Manwë or Varda, but was a lover of the Gardens of Lórien, and so knew much of the hopes and dreams of Men and Elves. Radagast, servant of Yavanna, loved the things of nature, both animals and plants. As each of these Istari learned from their Vala, so they acted in Middle-earth.

Gandalf 

Gandalf the Grey is a protagonist in The Hobbit, where he assists Bilbo Baggins on his quest, and in The Lord of the Rings, where he is the leader of the Company of the Ring. Tolkien took the name "Gandalf" from the Old Norse "Catalogue of Dwarves" (Dvergatal) in the Völuspá; its meaning in that language is "staff-elf". Originally called Olórin, he was the wisest of the Maiar and lived in Lórien until the Third Age, when Manwë tasked him to join the Istari and go to Middle-earth to protect its free peoples. He did not want to go as he feared Sauron, but Manwë persuaded him.

As a Wizard and the bearer of a Ring of Power, Gandalf has great power, but works mostly by encouraging and persuading. He sets out as Gandalf the Grey, possessing great knowledge, and travelling continually, always focused on his mission to counter Sauron. He is associated with fire, his ring being Narya, the Ring of Fire, and he both delights in fireworks to entertain the hobbits of the Shire, and in great need uses fire as a weapon. As one of the Maiar he is an immortal spirit, but being in a physical body on Middle-earth, he can be killed in battle, as he is by the Balrog from Moria. He is sent back to Middle-earth to complete his mission, now as Gandalf the White and leader of the Istari. 

Tolkien once described Gandalf as an angel incarnate; later, both he and other scholars likened Gandalf to the Norse god Odin in his "Wanderer" guise. Others have described Gandalf as a guide-figure who assists the protagonist, comparable to the Cumaean Sibyl who assisted Aeneas in Virgil's The Aeneid, or to Virgil himself in Dante's Inferno;  and as a Christ-figure, a prophet.

Saruman 

Saruman the White is leader of the Istari and of the White Council, in The Hobbit and at the outset in The Lord of the Rings. However, he desires Sauron's power for himself and plots to take over Middle-earth by force, remodelling Isengard along the lines of Sauron's Dark Tower, Barad-Dur.

Saruman's character illustrates the corruption of power; his desire for knowledge and order leads to his fall, and he rejects the chance of redemption when it is offered. The name Saruman means "man of skill or cunning" in the Mercian dialect of Anglo-Saxon; he serves as an example of technology and modernity being overthrown by forces more in tune with nature.

Radagast 

Radagast the Brown is mentioned in The Hobbit and in The Lord of the Rings. His role is so slight that it has been described as a plot device. He played a more significant part in Peter Jackson's The Hobbit film series. Some aspects of his characterisation were invented for the films, but the core elements of his character, namely communing with animals, skill with herbs, and shamanistic ability to change his shape and colours, are as described by Tolkien. Unusually among Middle-earth names, Radagast is Slavic, the name of a god.

Significance 

Tolkien stated that the main temptation facing the Wizards, and the one that brought down Saruman, was impatience. It led to a desire to force others to do good, and from there to a simple desire for power.

The Tolkien scholar Marjorie Burns writes that while Saruman is an "imitative and lesser" double of Sauron, reinforcing the Dark Lord's character type, he is also a contrasting double of Gandalf, who becomes Saruman as he "should have been", after Saruman fails in his original purpose.

Charles Nelson writes that although evil is personified in Sauron and his creatures such as Balrogs, along with Shelob and other "nameless things" deep below the mountains, evil threatens the characters from within, and the moral failures of those such as Saruman, Boromir, and Denethor endanger the world. Nelson notes that in a letter, Tolkien stated that "Myth and fairy-story must, as all art, reflect and contain in solution elements of moral and religious truth (or error), but not explicit, not in the known form of the primary 'real' world." Each race exemplifies one of the Seven Deadly Sins, for instance Dwarves embody greed, Men pride, Elves envy. In this scheme, the Wizards represent the angels sent by God, or as Tolkien wrote "Emissaries (in the terms of this tale from the Far West beyond the Sea)". Pride is the greatest of the Sins, and affects the Wizards who take the shape of Men. Saruman, like Lucifer, is overwhelmed by pride and vainglory, just as Denethor is. Nelson states that Saruman's argument for the need for power "definitely echoes" Hitler's rationalisations for the Second World War, despite Tolkien's claims to the contrary.

The scholar of humanities Patrick Curry rebuts the "common criticism" of Tolkien, levelled by literary critics such as the scholar of English literature Catherine Stimpson, that his characters are naively either good or evil. Curry writes that far from being "seemingly incorruptible" as Stimpson alleges, evil emerges among the Wizards.

William Senior contrasts Tolkien's Wizards as angelic emissaries with those in Stephen R. Donaldson's The Chronicles of Thomas Covenant (published 1977–2013), who are simply human. In Senior's view, where Tolkien used myth and a medieval hierarchy of orders of being, with Wizards higher than Elves who are higher than Men, Donaldson's Lords are "wholly human" and "function democratically".

Adaptations 

Three Wizards appear in Peter Jackson's The Lord of the Rings and The Hobbit film trilogies: Saruman, portrayed by Christopher Lee; Gandalf, portrayed by Ian McKellen; and Radagast, portrayed by Sylvester McCoy.

The critic Brian D. Walter writes that the films seek to make Gandalf a powerful character without having him take over the Fellowship's strategy and action. As in the novels, Gandalf is "an oddly ambivalent presence, extraordinarily powerful and authoritative ..., but also a stranger, the only one of the Istari who never settles down". On screen, Gandalf is necessarily "less remote, less liminal, more bodily present", less like an angelic spirit than in Tolkien, but in Walter's view this benefits the films' dramatic tension and helps to bring out many other characters. Still, he appears more as a magical than a heroic figure, for example when the Fellowship is attacked by wargs in Hollin, where he uses words and a firebrand rather than drawing his sword Glamdring.
Brian Rosebury calls the film Saruman "incipiently Shakespearean ... [with] the potential to rise to a kind of tragic dignity"; he considers that Lee attains a suitable presence as "a powerfully haunted and vindictive figure, if less self-deluding than Tolkien's", even if the film version of the verbal confrontation with Gandalf fails to rise to the same level.

Kristin Thompson notes that the Wizards' staffs are more elaborate in the films; their tips are "more convoluted" and can hold a crystal, which can be used to produce light.
Rosebury considers the staff-battle between Gandalf and Saruman in Orthanc "absurd", breaking the spell of the film in The Fellowship of the Ring, and coming "uncomfortably close" to the light-sabre fights in Star Wars.

In Amazon's series The Lord of the Rings: The Rings of Power, Daniel Weyman portrays "the Stranger", a Wizard who falls from the sky in a meteorite.

References

Primary 
This list identifies each item's location in Tolkien's writings.

Secondary

Sources 

 
 
 
 

Middle-earth Maiar
Fictional quintets